Joy Krishna Halder is an Indian politician, belonging to the Socialist Unity Centre of India (Communist). He was a member of the legislative assembly of West Bengal between 2006 and 2011, representing the Kutali seat. Halder lost the Kutali seat in the 2011 election to CPI(M) candidate 	Ramsankar Halder, the first time SUCI(C) lost the seat since 1977. SUCI(C) accused the Indian National Congress of cooperating with CPI(M) to defeat their candidate.

References

West Bengal MLAs 2006–2011
Socialist Unity Centre of India (Communist) politicians
Living people
1958 births